Borač is a municipality and village in Brno-Country District in the South Moravian Region of the Czech Republic. It has about 400 inhabitants.

Administrative parts
The village of Podolí is an administrative part of Borač.

References

Villages in Brno-Country District